"Wasted" is a song by Dutch DJ and record producer Tiësto featuring Matthew Koma, who co-wrote the song with Tiësto and Australian production and songwriting duo Twice as Nice. "Wasted" was first released on 25 April 2014 by PM:AM Recordings as the second single from Tiësto's fifth studio album, A Town Called Paradise. It was featured in 2014 action comedy film 22 Jump Street.

Background and release 
The song was announced by Tiësto in early April. A lyric video for the track was later uploaded to the artist's YouTube channel on 13 April 2014.

British radio station BBC Radio 1 opted to play an alternative version of the song titled "Naked", which replaced every occurrence of the term "wasted" with "naked".

Music video 
The song's accompanying music video was released on 25 April 2014. It runs for approximately three minutes and twenty-one seconds and is directed by Tabitha Denholm. The video features six women (Taylor Godfrey, Allegra Carpenter, Kassi Smith...) in 1960s-era outfits enjoying themselves. Tiësto and Matthew Koma are seen starring on a TV show called The Tiësto Show where Koma is also seen singing the song.

Track listing 
Digital download

Remixes

Yellow Claw Remix (SoundCloud)

Credits and personnel
Songwriting – Tijs Verwest, Matthew Koma, Twice as Nice
Production – Tiësto, Twice as Nice, Disco Fries
Vocals – Matthew Koma

Chart performance
In the United Kingdom, it became the first single which was released in 2014, to top the UK Dance Chart without topping the UK Singles Chart. As of 1 August 2014, "Wasted" was certified Silver (200,000 copies) in the United Kingdom and as of 15 June 2015, "Wasted" was certified Platinum (1,000,000 copies) in the United States.

Charts and certifications

Weekly charts

Year-end charts

Certifications

Release history

References

Tiësto songs
2014 songs
2014 singles
Songs written for films
Songs written by Matthew Koma
Songs written by Tiësto
Universal Music Group singles
Casablanca Records singles
Republic Records singles